Arthur William Middleton (7 June 1876 – 17 May 1945) was an Australian rules footballer who played with St Kilda and Fitzroy.

Sources
 Holmesby, Russell & Main, Jim (2007). The Encyclopedia of AFL Footballers. 7th ed. Melbourne: Bas Publishing.

1876 births
1945 deaths
Fitzroy Football Club players
St Kilda Football Club players
Australian rules footballers from Geelong